Muhammad Fariz (born 2 September 2004) is an Indonesian professional footballer who plays as a right-back for Liga 1 club PSS Sleman.

Career
Fariz signed for PSS Sleman to play in Liga 1 in the 2022 season. He made his professional debut on 16 December 2022 in a match against PSIS Semarang at the Manahan Stadium, Surakarta.

Career statistics

Club

References

External links
 
 Muhammad Fariz at Liga Indonesia

2004 births
Living people
People from Karanganyar Regency
Sportspeople from Central Java
Indonesian footballers
Association football defenders
Liga 1 (Indonesia) players
PSS Sleman players